Far North Queensland (FNQ) is the northernmost part of the Australian state of Queensland. Its largest city is Cairns and it is dominated geographically by Cape York Peninsula, which stretches north to the Torres Strait, and west to the Gulf Country. The waters of Torres Strait include the only international border in the area contiguous with the Australian mainland, between Australia and Papua New Guinea.

The region is home to three World Heritage Sites, the Great Barrier Reef, the Wet Tropics of Queensland and Riversleigh, Australia's largest fossil mammal site. Far North Queensland lays claim to over 70 national parks, including Mount Bartle Frere; with a peak of  it is the highest peak in both Northern Australia and Queensland.

The Far North region is the only region of Australia that is the indigenous country of both Aboriginal Australians and Torres Strait Islanders.

Far North Queensland supports a significant agricultural sector, a number of significant mines and is home to Queensland's largest wind farm, the Windy Hill Wind Farm.

Extent

Various government departments and agencies have different definitions for the region. The Queensland Government department of Trade and Investment Queensland defines the region as an area comprising the following 25 local government areas; Aurukun, Burke, Cairns, Carpentaria, Cassowary Coast, Cook, Croydon, Doomadgee, Douglas, Etheridge, Hope Vale, Kowanyama, Lockhart River, Mapoon, Mareeba, Mornington, Napranum, Northern Peninsula Area, Pormpuraaw, Tablelands, Torres Strait Islands (not autonomous), Torres Strait Islands (autonomous), Weipa, Wujal Wujal, Yarrabah.

Settlements
The main population and administrative centre of the region is the city of Cairns. Other key population centres include Cooktown, the Atherton Tableland, Weipa, Innisfail and the Torres Strait Islands. The region also consists of many Aboriginal and farming groups.

The northeastern point of Highway 1 passes through the region in the city of Cairns and connects the southern-running Bruce Highway to the western-running Savannah Way. Despite being Highway 1, not all sections of the Savannah Way are designated as a federally funded National Highway and certain sections remain unsealed.

Industry

Significant industries include tourism, cattle grazing, agriculture and mining of both sand and bauxite. Agricultural products generate between $600 and $700 million a year. Sugar cane, tropical fruits including bananas, mangoes, papaya, lychees and coffee are grown in Far North Queensland.

The region is home to the world's biggest silica mine at Cape Flattery. The mine was established in 1967 and was severely damaged by Cyclone Ita in 2014.  Rio Tinto Alcan operates a bauxite mine on the western coast of Cape York Peninsula near Weipa which contains one of the largest bauxite deposits in the world.

In recent years, Far North Queensland has become increasingly known for its artistic and creative offerings, with the Cairns Indigenous Art Fair, and Cairns Festival both held annually. Active arts organisation include the Tanks Arts Centre, Cairns Civic Theatre, and Cairns Art Gallery.

Tourism

The region supports a large tourism industry and is considered a premier tourist destination in Australia. Nearly one third of international visitors to the state come to the region. Attractions include the Great Barrier Reef, Daintree Rainforest and other Queensland tropical rain forests within the Wet Tropics of Queensland heritage area, the Atherton Tableland, Hinchinbrook Island and other resort islands such as Dunk Island and Green Island.  Major attractions around and in Cairns include The Reef Hotel Casino, Kuranda Scenic Railway, Barron Falls and the Skyrail Rainforest Cableway.  Towns and localities attracting large numbers of tourists include Cape Tribulation, Port Douglas, Mission Beach and Cardwell.

Demographics
The Australian Bureau of Statistics estimates the region's population at 280,638 in 2014. The region contains 25.6% of the state's Indigenous population, or 28,909 people, making up 11.8% of the region's population.

History
Yalanji  (also known as Kuku Yalanji, Kuku Yalaja, Kuku Yelandji, and Gugu Yalanji) is an Australian Aboriginal language of Far North Queensland. The traditional language region is Mossman River in the south to the Annan River in the north, bordered by the Pacific Ocean in the east and extending inland to west of Mount Mulgrave. This includes the local government boundaries of the Shire of Douglas, the Shire of Cook and the Aboriginal Shire of Wujal Wujal and the towns and localities of Cooktown, Mossman, Daintree, Cape Tribulation and Wujal Wujal. It includes the head of the Palmer River, the Bloomfield River, China Camp, Maytown, and Palmerville.

Far North Queensland is the location of the first amber fossils to be found in Australia. The four-million-year-old fossils were found on a beach in Cape York Peninsula but were probably washed ashore after drifting with the currents for about 200 km. In the 1860s, Richard Daintree discovered gold and copper deposits along several rivers which led early prospectors to the area.

Cyclones
The region suffered Queensland's worst maritime disaster on 4 March 1899 when the Mahina Cyclone destroyed all 100 ships moored in Princess Charlotte Bay. The entire North Queensland pearling fleet was in the bay at the time of the cyclone. Approximately 100 Aboriginals assisting survivors and 307 men from the pearling fleet were drowned. Its pressure was measured at 914 hPa with a recorded tidal surge of 13 m, the highest ever in Australia. The 1918 Mackay cyclone hit the Queensland coast in January of that year, killing 30 people.

In March 1997, Cyclone Justin resulted in the deaths of seven people.  In early 2000, Cyclone Steve caused major flooding between Cairns and Mareeba.  Cyclone Larry crossed the Queensland coast near Innisfail in March 2006.  The storm resulted in an estimated $1.5 billion worth of damage and damaged 10,000 homes. 80% of Australia's banana crop was destroyed.  Cyclone Monica was the most intense cyclone on record in terms of wind speed to cross the Australian coast. It impacted the Northern Territory and Far North Queensland in April 2006.  In January 2011, Cyclone Yasi passed over Tully and resulted in an estimated $3.6 billion worth of damage, making it the costliest cyclone ever to hit Australia.

Tropical North Queensland
Far North Queensland has a tropical climate and as such, the name Tropical North Queensland is also used as the name for the region, mostly due to the tourism industry. Tourism Tropical North Queensland (TTNQ) defines its area from Cardwell in the south up to the Torres Strait in the north and west to the Queensland border with the Northern Territory. However, the phrase Tropical North Queensland is ambiguous and may be used to name a wider area including parts of North Queensland, or even Mackay.

See also

 Proposal for a new state of North Queensland
 Regions of Queensland

References

External links
 Watch historical footage of Babinda, Cairns and Far North Queensland  from the National Film and Sound Archive of Australia's collection.

 
Northern Australia